Rodrickus Windsor (born April 24, 1985) is an American football wide receiver who is currently a free agent. He played college football at Western New Mexico University.

College career
Rod began his college career at Garden City Community College in Garden City, Kansas before transferring to Western New Mexico University as a quarterback. As a junior, he led his team in both passing (1,361) and rushing (886) yards and a 118.61 passer rating before reluctantly switching to wide receiver for his senior season.  In his only collegiate season as a wide receiver, caught 81 passes for 1,118 yards and six touchdowns.

Professional career

Rio Grande Valley Dorados
Rod spent the 2009 af2 season with the Rio Grande Valley Dorados after the Arena Football League (AFL) filed for bankruptcy, catching 184 passes for 2,364 yards and 59 TDs in 15 games.  He was named the Offensive Player of the Year and the Rookie of the Year.

Arizona Rattlers
He followed that success by playing the 2010 season with the Arizona Rattlers of the AFL, where he was named the AFL's Rookie of the Year after recording 193 catches for 2,372 yards and 47 touchdowns.

Sacramento Mountain Lions
After the Arizona Rattlers season, Rod was signed by the Sacramento Mountain Lions on August 22, 2010.  Rod had 25 catches for 379 yards, good for 5th and 3rd in the league respectively, and tied for the league lead with 3 receiving touchdowns.

Arizona Rattlers
In response to the NFL lockout, Windsor went back to the AFL and signed with the Arizona Rattlers, where he caught 156 passes for 1,830 yards and 36 touchdowns.  As with the 2010 season, Rod was again voted to the First Team All-Arena team.

Cleveland Browns/Buffalo Bills
Rod was signed by the Cleveland Browns to their practice roster on December 3, 2010 where he spent one week before being released.  He was subsequently signed by the Buffalo Bills to their practice squad on December 30, 2010, where he finished the season.

Rod signed a futures contract with the Browns on January 19, 2011 where he spent the preseason catching 5 receptions, 83 yards and a touchdown.  He was waived during the final round of cuts.  He was re-signed to the practice squad, where he spent the first 15 weeks before being promoted to active roster on December 22, 2011.  He did not dress the final two games of the season.

Rod spent the preseason with the Browns, catching 5 balls for 51 yards and a touchdown.    He was released during final cuts on August 31, 2012; however, he was re-signed to the practice squad on October 10, 2012.

Arizona Rattlers
After not re-signing with the Cleveland Browns, Windsor returned to the Arizona Rattlers. In 2013, Windsor was named Second Team All-Arena, helping the Rattlers return to the ArenaBowl. The Rattlers defeated the Philadelphia Soul 48–39, with Windsor earning ArenaBowl XXVI MVP honors with 10 receptions for 145 yards. He retired after the 2016 season.

Washington Valor
On March 31, 2018, Windsor was assigned to the Washington Valor.

References

External links
 Cleveland Browns biography

1985 births
Living people
American football wide receivers
Arizona Rattlers players
Sportspeople from Bessemer, Alabama
Players of American football from Alabama
Rio Grande Valley Dorados players
Sacramento Mountain Lions players
Western New Mexico Mustangs football players
Cleveland Browns players
Buffalo Bills players
Washington Valor players
American football quarterbacks